Pinus canariensis, the Canary Island pine, is a species of gymnosperm in the conifer family Pinaceae. It is a large, evergreen tree, native and endemic to the outer Canary Islands of the Atlantic Ocean.

Description
A characteristic of the species is the occurrence of glaucous (bluish-green) epicormic shoots growing from the lower trunk, but in its natural area this only occurs as a consequence of fire or other damage. Its closest relatives are the chir pine (P. roxburghii) from the Himalayas, the Mediterranean pines P. pinea, P. halepensis, P. pinaster and P. brutia from the eastern Mediterranean.

Taxonomy 
Pinus canariensis was first described in 1825 by Augustin Pyramus de Candolle, who attributed the name to Christen Smith. It has been placed in subsection Pinaster of subgenus Pinus, section Pinus. The other species in the subsection are mainly Mediterranean in distribution, with one species (P. roxburghii) from the Himalayas.

Distribution and habitat
The species is native and endemic to the outer Canary Islands (Gran Canaria, Tenerife, El Hierro and La Palma).

The native range has been somewhat reduced due to over-cutting so that only the islands of Tenerife, La Palma and Gran Canaria still have large forests. Really big trees are still rare due to past over-cutting. It is the tallest tree in the Canary Islands.

Fossil record 
Fossils of Pinus canariensis have been described from the fossil flora of Kızılcahamam district in Turkey which is of early Pliocene age.

Ecology 
This pine is one of the most fire-resistant conifers in the world, due to several beneficial adaptations.

Uses 
The tree's extremely long needles make a significant contribution to the islands' water supply, trapping large amounts of condensation from the moist air coming off the Atlantic with the prevailing north eastern wind (locally called "alisios"). The condensation then drops to the ground and is quickly absorbed by the soil, eventually percolating down to the underground aquifers.

The aromatic wood, especially the heartwood, is among the finest of pine woods, being hard, strong and durable.

In mainland Spain, South Africa, Sicily and Australia, it has become a naturalized species from original landscape uses.

Pinus canariensis is a popular ornamental tree in warmer climates, such as in private gardens, public landscapes, and as street trees in California.

In culture
It is the vegetable symbol of the island of La Palma.

Gallery

See also
 List of animal and plant symbols of the Canary Islands

References

External links

University of Murcia: Tenerife Island, Canarias, Spain: Pinus canariensis
University of Murcia - World Plants: Pinus canariensis Images gallery
University of California: Davis Pinus canariensis

canariensis
Endemic flora of the Canary Islands
Endemic flora of Macaronesia
Ornamental trees
Trees of Mediterranean climate
Trees of mild maritime climate
Drought-tolerant trees
Garden plants of Europe
Least concern plants